Maudie was a   tanker that was built in 1920 by Lithgows, Port Glasgow, Scotland. Laid down as War Peshwa for the British Shipping Controller, she was completed as Maudie for a Norwegian company. In 1937, she was sold to Finland and renamed Angra. A further sale in 1942 saw her renamed Mercator.

She was seized by Germany in 1944 and then seized by the United Kingdom as a prize of war, passing to the Ministry of War Transport (MoWT) as Empire Crouch. In 1946, she was returned to her Finnish owner and regained her former name Mercator. A sale in 1956 saw her renamed Ruth Nurminen. She served until scrapped in 1959.

Description
The ship was built in 1920 by Lithgows Ltd, Port Glasgow. She was Yard Number 725.

The engine was built by Rankin & Blackmore, Greenock. She was assessed as Ice Class IIA.

History
Laid down as War Peshwa for the British Shipping Controller, she was launched as Maudie on 30 July 1920. Maudie was a whale oil refinery ship, she was owned by A/S Hvalen, Tønsberg, Norway and operated under the management of N Bugge. The Code Letters LBDM were allocated. In 1929, she was sold to A/S Hektor, Tonsberg. On 9 January 1937, Maudie was sold to Rederi AB Atlanta-Laivanvarustaja OY Atlanta, Helsinki. Her port of registry was Helsinki. The Code Letters OFAJ and Finnish Official Number 804 were allocated. Converted to a dry cargo ship, she was operated under the management of Birger Krogius, Helsinki until 1938. On 14 January, she  was renamed Angra. On 5 February, she arrived at Turku for conversion to a cargo ship by Ab Crichton-Vulcan Oy. In 1942, Angra was sold to AB Finland — Amerika Linjen OY (Finland America Line) and renamed Mercator, in place of an earlier ship of that name which had been sunk by enemy action on 1 December 1939. Her draught was assessed as 

On 2 September 1944, Mercator was loading coal at Danzig when Germany broke off relations with Finland. Loading was stopped and her cargo was discharged on 5 September. She attempted to leave Danzig on 12 September but was prevented from doing so. On 16 September, Mercator was seized by Germany, passing to the Kriegsmarine on 24 September. Her crew were interned at Stutthof until May 1945. On 16 October 1944, Mercator was placed under the ownership of Atlas Reederi AG. She was placed under the management of Schulte & Bruns, Emden. The Code Letters DKML were allocated. These were later changed to DVQB. Mercator was seized in May 1945 at Copenhagen, Denmark. On 11 September, she was brought before the Prize Court as a prize of war. Mercator was passed to the MoWT and renamed Empire Crouch. In 1946, she was chartered to the Finnish Government and renamed Mercator. She was reallocated her former Official Number and Code Letters. Mercator was operated by her former owners, to whom she was returned in 1948.

In 1951, Mercator was sold to Suomen Höyrylaiva OY — Finska Ångfartygs AB (Finsk Line), Helsinki. In 1955, her draught was reassessed as  In 1957, she was sold to John Nurminen OY, Helsinki, and was renamed Ruth Nurminen. Ruth Nurminen served until 1959, arriving on 4 April at Yokohama, Japan for scrapping.

References

Notes
 See rationale at talk page as to the usability of this source.

Further reading

1920 ships
Ships built on the River Clyde
Standard World War I ships
Steamships of Norway
Merchant ships of Norway
Steamships of Finland
Merchant ships of Finland
World War II merchant ships of Finland
Captured ships
Steamships of Germany
World War II merchant ships of Germany
Empire ships
Ministry of War Transport ships
Steamships of the United Kingdom
Merchant ships of the United Kingdom